Jan Martin Andersson (born 22 July 1969) is a Swedish Olympic sailor. He finished 4th in the 470 event at the 2004 Summer Olympics together with Johan Molund.

References

Swedish male sailors (sport)
Olympic sailors of Sweden
470 class sailors
Kullaviks Kanot- och Kappseglingsklubb sailors
Sailors at the 2004 Summer Olympics – 470
1969 births
Living people
Place of birth missing (living people)